Hollinger is an unincorporated community in Furnas County, Nebraska, United States.

History
Hollinger was named by the railroad.  A post office was established in Hollinger in 1905, and remained in operation until it was discontinued in 1944.

References

Populated places in Furnas County, Nebraska
Unincorporated communities in Nebraska